Ajay Ghosh is an Indian actor who primarily appears in Telugu and Tamil-language films in negative roles. He is known for his roles in Jyothi Lakshmi (2015) and Visaranai (2016), Mookuthi Amman (2020) and Pushpa: The Rise (2021).

Career 
Ajay Ghosh started his acting career in DD Telugu and found his way up to feature films before getting his breakthrough with Vetrimaaran's Visaranai (2016). In the film, he plays a strict police inspector from Guntur. In a review of the film by The Times of India, the reviewer wrote that he "plays the ruthless inspector with glee". Ghosh went on to play negative characters in several films including Jyothi Lakshmi (2015), Baahubali 2: The Conclusion (2017) and Mei (2019). In a review of the film by the New Indian Express, the reviewer stated that " Ajay Ghosh hams it up as his (Kishore's) subordinate".

Filmography

Telugu films 

Prasthanam (2010)
Ramadandu (2012)
Autonagar Surya (2014)
Run Raja Run (2014)
Jyothi Lakshmi (2015)
Express Raja (2016)
Kundanapu Bomma (2016)
Selfie Raja (2016)
Ism (2016)
Saptagiri Express (2016)
Egise Taara Juvvalu (2017)
Aakatayi (2017)
Baahubali 2: The Conclusion (2017)
 Venkatapuram (2017)
London Babulu (2017)
Bhaagamathie (2018)
Rangasthalam (2018)
Shambho Shankara (2018)
Anthaku Minchi (2018)
Moodu Puvvulu Aaru Kayalu (2018)
Vadena (2018)
Mithai (2019)
Brochevarevarura (2019)
Edaina Jaragocchu (2019)
Undiporaadhey (2019)
Raju Gari Gadhi 3 (2019)
Madhanam (2019)
Mathu Vadalara (2019)
 Uttara (2020)
Orey Bujjiga (2020)
Bangaru Bullodu (2021)
Akshara (2021)
Shaadi Mubarak (2021)
Raja Raja Chora (2021)
Manchi Rojulochaie (2021)
Pushpa: The Rise (2021)
Pushpa 2: The Rule (2022)
Suraapanam (2022)
Nireekshana (TBA)

Tamil films 
 Visaranai (2016)
 Baahubali 2: The Conclusion (2017)
 Thappu Thanda (2017)
 Bhaagamathie (2018)
 Maari 2 (2018)
 Natpe Thunai (2019)
 Kanchana 3 (2019)
 Mei (2019)
 Mookuthi Amman (2020)

Kannada films 
 Kariya 2 (2017)
 Govinda Govinda (2021)

Webseries
Bhajana Batch

Awards and nominations

References

External links 

Male actors in Kannada cinema
Male actors in Tamil cinema
Male actors in Telugu cinema
Year of birth missing (living people)
Living people
21st-century Indian male actors
Male actors from Andhra Pradesh
Telugu male actors
Indian male film actors
People from Prakasam district
South Indian International Movie Awards winners